The Florham Park School District is a comprehensive community public school district that serves students in kindergarten through eighth grade from Florham Park, in Morris County, New Jersey, United States.

As of the 2018–19 school year, the district, comprising three schools, had an enrollment of 994 students and 92.2 classroom teachers (on an FTE basis), for a student–teacher ratio of 10.8:1.

The district is classified by the New Jersey Department of Education as being in District Factor Group "I", the second-highest of eight groupings. District Factor Groups organize districts statewide to allow comparison by common socioeconomic characteristics of the local districts. From lowest socioeconomic status to highest, the categories are A, B, CD, DE, FG, GH, I and J.

Students in public school for ninth through twelfth grades are served by the Hanover Park Regional High School District, attending Hanover Park High School together with students from East Hanover Township, where the school is located. The district also serves students from the neighboring community of Hanover Township at Whippany Park High School in the Whippany section of Hanover Township. As of the 2018–19 school year, the high school had an enrollment of 839 students and 76.6 classroom teachers (on an FTE basis), for a student–teacher ratio of 11.0:1.

Schools
The schools in the district (with 2018–19 school enrollment data from the National Center for Education Statistics) are:
Elementary schools
Briarwood Elementary School with 358 students in grades PreK-2
Samantha Heimple, Principal
Brooklake Elementary School with 313 students in grades 3-5
Kerri Waibel, Principal
Middle school
Ridgedale Middle School with 319 students in grades 6-8
Peter Christ, Principal

Administration
Core members of the district's administration are:
Dr. Steven Caponegro, Superintendent
John Csatlos, Business Administrator / Board Secretary

Board of education
The district's board of education, with nine members, sets policy and oversees the fiscal and educational operation of the district through its administration. As a Type II school district, the board's trustees are elected directly by voters to serve three-year terms of office on a staggered basis, with three seats up for election each year held (since 2012) as part of the November general election. The board appoints a superintendent to oversee the day-to-day operation of the district.

References

External links
Florham Park School District

Florham Park School District, National Center for Education Statistics
Hanover Park Regional High School District
Hanover Park High School

Florham Park, New Jersey
New Jersey District Factor Group I
School districts in Morris County, New Jersey